was a daimyō (feudal lord) in Shimōsa Province, and top government advisor and official in the Tokugawa shogunate of Japan. He served as rōjū (chief advisor) to shōgun Tokugawa Ietsuna from 1679–80, and as Tairō (head of the rōjū council) under Tokugawa Tsunayoshi from the 12th day of the 11th lunar month of 1681 until his death on 7 October 1684.

Life and career
His father was Hotta Masamori, advisor (Tairō) under the previous shōgun, Tokugawa Iemitsu, who committed seppuku upon Iemitsu's death in 1651. Masatoshi was then adopted by Iemitsu's nurse, Kasuga no Tsubone.

He served as personal secretary to the next shōgun, Tokugawa Ietsuna, for a time, before being appointed wakadoshiyori (junior councillor) in 1670. Ietsuna was already quite ill when Masatoshi was appointed rōjū in 1679, and died the following summer. At this time, another rōjū, Sakai Tadakiyo, in a bid for personal power, proposed that the next shōgun be selected from the princely houses. He sought to be regent to this new shōgun, who would be made a puppet ruler. However, Masatoshi, said to have been infuriated, voiced strong opposition to this scheme; Tadakiyo resigned his post shortly afterwards, and Ietsuna's brother Tokugawa Tsunayoshi was installed as the new shogun.

Masatoshi became Tairō soon afterwards, and was granted a domain worth 13,000 koku by Tsunayoshi. He was killed several years later, on 7 October 1684. The motives of the culprit, Masatoshi's cousin Inaba Masayasu, are unknown. Following Masatoshi's death, Tsunayoshi took the opportunity to reorganize the shogunate's offices so as to weaken the rōjū and grant additional powers to the Soba-yōnin (Chamberlains). Masatoshi was not succeeded as Tairō, and much of his power came to be wielded by the shōgun himself.

|-

References
Frederic, Louis (2002). "Hotta Masatoshi". Japan Encyclopedia. Cambridge, Massachusetts: Harvard University Press. p360.
Sansom, George (1963). A History of Japan: 1615–1867. Stanford, California: Stanford University Press. pp68, 131–132.

1634 births
1684 deaths
Daimyo
Tairō
Rōjū